Cyril Anthony George Bertram (19 November, 1897 - July 1978) was a British novelist and art historian.

Bertram was the great-grandfather of actor Thomas Sangster. His wife, Barbara May (Randolph), was the sister of actor Hugh Grant's maternal grandmother; Barbara was descended from politician and colonial administrator Sir Evan Nepean.

Works
English Portraiture in the National Portrait Gallery (1924)
The Pool (1926) novel
Here We Ride (1927) novel
The Life of Sir Peter-Paul Rubens (1928)
Velázquez (1928)
To the Mountains (1929)
The Sword Falls (1930)
Picasso (1930)
Matisse (1930)
They Came to the Castle (1932)
Pavements and Peaks: Impressions of Travel in Germany and Austria (1933)
Favourite British Paintings (1934)
The House : A Machine for Living in (1935)
Men Adrift (1935)
The King Sees Red (1936)
Like the Phoenix (1936) novel
Design in Everyday Things (1937)
Ode to a Bulging Member (1937)
Design in Daily Life (1937)
Design (1938)
Contemporary Painting in Europe (1939)
Bright Defiler (1940)
Jan Vermeer of Delft (1948)
William Blake (1948)
Hans Holbein the Younger (1948)
Sandro Botticelli (1948)
Vermeer (1948)
Piero della Francesca (1949)
Pieter Bruegel the Elder (1949)
Michelangelo (1949)
Jean-Augustine-Dominique Ingres (1949)
El Greco (1949)
Hogarth (1949)
The Van Eycks : Hubert & Jan (1950)
Delacroix (1950)
The Pleasures Of Poverty: An Argument and an Anthology (1950)
Hieronymus Bosch (1950)
Grunewald (1950)
Rubens (1950)
Gauguin (1950)
Giotto (1951)
A Century of British Painting 1851-1951 (1951)
Paul Nash: The Portrait of an Artist (1955)
Poet and Painter: Correspondence between Gordon Bottomley and Paul Nash 1910-1946 (1955); editor with Claude Colleer Abbott
Rembrandt (1955)
Sickert (1955)
Modigliani (1965)
One Thousand Years of Drawing (1966)
Florentine Sculpture (1969)

References

1897 births
1978 deaths
British art critics
British art historians